Hā'upu is a mountain peak located in Kauai County, Hawaii.

References

Landforms of Kauai
Mountains of Hawaii